The What's Love? Tour is the eighth concert tour by singer Tina Turner. The tour supported Turner's autobiographical film and its soundtrack and the eighth studio album entitled What's Love Got to Do with It (1993). The tour primarily visited North America along with a few shows in Europe and Australasia.

Background 
In 1990, Turner mentioned her record-breaking, 1990 tour, would be her last. Initially, Turner was to have a one-year break before resuming the tour in North America. The tour continuation was placed on hold as Turner decided to focus on acquiring movie roles. As time progressed, Turner changed her focus to the production of her semi-autobiographical film. In an interview with People, Turner stated, 

Turner's last tour of North America was in 1987 during her Break Every Rule World Tour, which saw poor ticket sales for a majority of shows. Turner later confessed that she did not tour her previous record due to lack of sales in that region, as many spectators still had a hard time disconnecting her from The Revue. After numerous sold-out stadium performances in Europe, Turner wanted to do an intimate tour. The tour consisted of the same music and costumes as her previous set. Turner included new material from the soundtrack, along with different variations on her well-known hits. Originally destined as a North America only tour, Turner decided to add a few dates in Europe for summer music festivals and Australia where she appeared at the New South Wales Rugby League Grand Final, as their anthem was "The Best". In Australia, Turner also performed the after-race concert following the 1993 Australian Grand Prix in Adelaide where she was joined on stage by the race winner, triple World Drivers' Champion Ayrton Senna.

Broadcasts and recordings 
The tour was chronicled at the Blockbuster Pavilion in San Bernardino, California. Released in September 1994, "What's Love: Live" included a special performance of "Why Must We Wait Until Tonight". It was directed by David Mallett and produced by Paul Flattery. Additionally, the concert was recorded in Sydney, New South Wales, Australia at the Sydney Entertainment Centre as a special for local television.

Opening act 
Lindsey Buckingham (North America) (select dates)
Chris Isaak (North America) (select dates)
John Mellencamp (Switzerland)
Joe Cocker (Switzerland)

Setlist 
The following setlist was obtained from the concert held on July 28, 1993, at the Thames River Music Center in Groton, Connecticut. It does not represent all concerts for the duration of the tour.
Act 1
"Steamy Windows"
"Typical Male"
"Foreign Affair"
"Undercover Agent for the Blues"
"Private Dancer"
"We Don't Need Another Hero"
"I Can't Stand the Rain"
"Nutbush City Limits"
Act 2
"Addicted to Love"
"The Best"
"I Don't Wanna Fight"
"Let's Stay Together"
"What's Love Got to Do with It"
"Proud Mary"
Encore
"What You Get Is What You See"
"Better Be Good to Me"

Tour dates 

Music Festivals and other miscellaneous performances
This concert was a part of "Summerfest"
This concert was a part of the "Y100 20th Birthday Party"
This concert was a part of "Rock Over Danube"
These concerts were a part of "Rock Over Germany '93"
This concert was a part of the "Australian Grand Prix"

Box office score data

Tour band 
James Ralston – electric guitar, vocals
John Miles – electric guitar, vocals
Bob Feit – bass guitar
Jack Bruno – drums
Timmy Cappello – percussion, synthesizer, tenor saxophone, harmonica, vocals
Ollie Marland – synthesizer, vocals
Kenny Moore – piano, vocals
Sharon Owens – dancer, vocals
Karen Owens – dancer, vocals

External links 
International Tina Turner Fan Club – Tour – What's Love 1993

References 

1993 concert tours
Tina Turner concert tours